Everett Irwin Mendelsohn (born October 28, 1931) is an American historian of science. He is Professor Emeritus of the History of Science at Harvard University, where he was a faculty member from 1960 until his retirement in 2007. He is a co-founder of the American Association for the Advancement of Science's Committee on Science, Arms Control, and National Security and of the American Academy of Arts and Sciences' Committee on International Security Studies. A self-described pacifist, he has been active in attempting to negotiate peace in the Middle East both as the chair of the American Academy of Arts and Sciences' Committee on Middle East Studies and through his work with the American Friends Service Committee. He founded the Journal of the History of Biology in 1968 and served as its editor-in-chief for 31 years thereafter. He was elected as a member of the American Academy of Arts and Sciences in 1970. He received the Gregor Mendel Medal from the Czechoslovak Academy of Sciences in 1991 and the Phi Beta Kappa Teaching Prize in 1996. In 1998, the Harvard Graduate Council honored Mendelsohn's work mentoring students by establishing the Everett Mendelsohn Excellence in Mentoring Award, which is given annually to academics who are judged to have gone above and beyond in mentoring graduate students at Harvard. In 2007, when Mendelsohn announced his impending retirement, his Harvard colleague Anne Harrington described him as "one of the founders of the social history of science." In 2017, the Journal of the History of Biology established the Everett Mendelsohn Prize in his honor.

Mendelsohn met Mary Maule Leeds soon after they had both graduated from Antioch College. They started graduate school at Harvard together in 1953 and were married in 1954.

References

External links
Faculty page

Living people
20th-century American historians
Historians of science
People from Yonkers, New York
1931 births
Antioch College alumni
Harvard University alumni
Harvard University faculty
American pacifists
Academic journal editors
Fellows of the American Academy of Arts and Sciences